Hygrotus inaequalis  is a species of Dytiscidae native to Europe.

References

Hygrotus
Beetles described in 1777
Beetles of Europe